Rahim Yar Khan District (Urdu, Saraiki: ضلع رحیم یار خان) is a district in the province of Punjab, Pakistan. Its headquarters is the city of Rahim Yar Khan.

Administrative
The district of Rahim Yar Khan is subdivided into four tehsils:

 Khanpur
 Liaqatpur
 Rahim Yar Khan
 Sadiqabad

History
Rahim Yar Khan has had the status of a separate district since 1943. The district derives its name from its headquarters, the city of Rahim Yar Khan, which was known as "Naushehra" until 1881. To avoid confusion with the similarly named city of Nowshera, the ruler of Bahawalpur, Nawab Sadiq Khan IV, renamed it after his first son, Rahim Yar Khan.

Geography
The district lies between 27°40'-29°16' north latitudes and 60°45'-70°01' east longitudes. The riverain area of the district lies close to eastern bank of the river Indus and Panjnad. The Rahim Yar Khan District is bounded on the north by Muzaffargarh District, on the east by Bahawalpur District, on the south by Jaisalmer district (India) and Ghotki District of Sindh province, and on the west by Rajanpur District.

This district is divided into three main physical features: (a) Riverside area, b) canal-irrigated area, and (c) desert area which is called Cholistan. The Riverside area of the district lies close on the southern side of the Indus river mainly falling in the river bed. The canal-irrigated area lies on the south and is separated by main Minchan Bund. The third part of the area, called Cholistan, lies in the south of the irrigated tract up to the Indo-Pak border.

Demographics
At the time of the 2017 census the district had a population of 4,807,762, of which 2,461,780 were males and 2,345,413 females. Rural population is 3,776,779 while the urban population is 1,030,983. The literacy rate was 46.62%.

Religion

Muslims were the predominant religious community with 96.50% of the population while Hindus (including Scheduled Castes) were 3.12% of the population. The Bhagwan Shri Krishna Mandir in Sadiqabad is one of the main Hindu temple in Rahim Yar Khan district.  While other minorities like Christians, Ahmadi etc. are very small in number. The proportion of population of Muslims is higher in urban than rural areas.

Languages
At the time of the 2017 Census of Pakistan, the distribution of the population of Rahim Yar Khan District by first language was as follows:
 64.9% Saraiki
 24.9% Punjabi
 3.0% Urdu
 1.9% Sindhi
 1.5% Balochi
 0.8% Pashto
 0.8% Hindko
 0.1% Brahui
 0.0% Kashmiri
 2.0% Others

The local dialect (see Riasti) belongs to the southern dialect group of Saraiki. Other languages spoken are Bagri/Cholistani and Haryanvi.

Education
The literacy rate in the district is 98% total for the 1st grade level school, locally known as 'graduating the MA full Examination'.
One of top ranked universities in Punjab, Khwaja Fareed University of Engineering and Information Technology is also located in district Rahim Yar Khan.
The Islamia university of Bahawalpur,Rahim yar Khan campus.

Sugar Cane 
Rahim Yar Khan District has recently embraced sugar cane. The area under cultivation of sugar cane increased to 430,000 acres in 2020 from 310,000 acres in 2014-15. Six sugar mills are located in the district.

Notable people
Ahmed Raza, first class cricketer.
Asim Saleem Bajwa, Pakistani three star general who was the director-general of the Inter-Services Public Relations.
Makhdoom Altaf Ahmed, former Provincial Minister (Punjab) Finance & Excise and Taxation. 
Makhdoom Shahbuddin, Former Federal Minister of Pakistan for Textiles. 
Makhdoom Ahmed Mehmood elected to the Punjab and National Assemblies.
Makhdoom Khusro Bakhtiar politician who currently serves as the Federal Minister of National Food Security and Research, since 19 November 2019. He has also been the Federal Minister for Planning, Development and Reforms.
Makhdoom Hashim Jawan Bakht politician who is the current Finance Minister of Punjab.
Muniba Mazari, motivational speaker. 
Rais Muhammad Iqbal, former Provincial Minister (Punjab) for Mines and Mineral Affairs. 
AVM (Rtd) Mushtaq Laghari, former ambassador to UAE.
Shafqat Mehmood , current Federal Education Minister
Aima Baig , First Class Singer
Talha Chahour, Actor

See also
Shaikh Zayed International Airport
Shaikh Zayed Medical College and Hospital
Bhong Masjid
Patan minara
Mian Wali Qureshian
Sadiqabad
Liaqatpur
Kot Sabzal
Firoza

References

 
Districts of Punjab, Pakistan